Crenicichla lacustris is a species of cichlid native to South America. It is found in the coastal drainages of southeastern and eastern Brazil. And is reported from Argentina.

References

Kullander, S.O., 2003. Cichlidae (Cichlids). p. 605-654. In R.E. Reis, S.O. Kullander and C.J. Ferraris, Jr. (eds.) Checklist of the Freshwater Fishes of South and Central America. Porto Alegre: EDIPUCRS, Brasil. 

lacustris
Fish of Argentina
Freshwater fish of Brazil
Taxa named by François-Louis Laporte, comte de Castelnau
Fish described in 1855